Paugus was chief of the Pequawket tribe which lived along the Saco River in present-day Conway, New Hampshire, and Fryeburg, Maine. He was killed at the Battle of Pequawket in 1725 during Father Rale's War.

Paugus translates into English as "The Oak". Paugus Bay was named for him.

See also
 Battle of Pequawket

References

People in Father Rale's War
1725 deaths
History of Maine
Native American leaders
Murdered Native American people
Year of birth unknown
People from Conway, New Hampshire
People from Fryeburg, Maine
Native American people from Maine